Dowdej or Dudej may refer to:
 Dowdej, Shiraz
 Dudej, Zarqan, Shiraz County